Ostro is a southerly wind of the Mediterranean.

Ostro may also refer to:
 Steven J. Ostro, American astronomer
 3169 Ostro, an asteroid named for Steven J. Ostro
 Hans Christian Ostrø, a Norwegian who was kidnapped and killed in Jammu and Kashmir in 1995
 Paul Fidrmuc codenamed Ostro, a Lisbon-based Nazi spy
 A video-game enemy appearing in Super Mario Bros. 2 and erroneously referred to in its instruction manual and end credits as "Birdo"
 Birdo, the Mario-franchise character erroneously referred to as Ostro in the Super Mario Bros. 2 instruction manual and end credits
 Ostrobothnia (region), an administrational area in Finland.

See also 
Austro (disambiguation)